The Public Service Railway operated the following streetcar lines in the U.S. state of New Jersey. Public Service assigned odd numbers to streetcar routes (as shown here) and even numbers to bus routes.

Bergen Division

Central Division

Essex Division

Hudson Division

Passaic Division

Southern Division

References

External links
PSCT Hudson Bergen Passaic Volume II
http://viewoftheblue.com/photography/psnj.html

Public Service Railway list